(Derek) John Penrose (5 May 1914 – 22 May 1983) was a British actor. After graduating from RADA in 1936, he made his London stage debut the following year in Old Music at the St. James' Theatre.

His best-known role was in the 1949 film Kind Hearts and Coronets, where he played Lionel, Sibella's dull husband whom Louis was accused of murdering.

Filmography

References

External links

1914 births
1983 deaths
English male stage actors
English male film actors
20th-century English male actors
British male comedy actors